was a Japanese professional sumo wrestler from Kōchi. He was the sport's 32nd yokozuna. He won a total of nine top division yūshō or tournament championships from 1929 to 1936, and was the dominant wrestler in sumo until the emergence of Futabayama. He died whilst still an active wrestler.

Career
He was born . He joined Nishonoseki stable but the stable was very small at that time. Therefore, he often visited Dewanoumi stable and was trained by yokozuna Tochigiyama Moriya. He later became head coach of Nishonoseki stable whilst still active in the ring, and under his leadership the stable enjoyed one of its most successful periods in its history.

Tamanishiki won three consecutive championships from October 1930 to March 1931, but he was not promoted to yokozuna. In January 1932, the  broke out. The incident was the biggest walkout in sumo history. He won his fifth top division championship in May 1932 and was finally awarded a yokozuna licence in November 1932. He was the first yokozuna in sumo since the retirement of Miyagiyama a year and a half earlier. His promotion was seen as a reward for staying with the Sumo Association and helping them through the Shunjuen Incident.

Tamanishiki often went to Tatsunami stable and trained wrestlers, such as later yokozuna Futabayama Sadaji. Tatsunami stable was small at that time, but the stable became stronger in the sumo world later on. Tamanishiki defeated Futabayama the first six times they met in competition, but he was never able to beat him again after Futabayama began his record winning run in 1936.

Tamanishiki was the first yokozuna to raise one leg high while performing yokozuna dohyō-iri (the yokozuna ring-entering ceremony). His style was said to have been beautiful and when Futabayama was promoted to yokozuna he emulated this style. This style is very popular now in yokozuna ceremonies.

In 1938, Tamanishiki died while an active sumo wrestler, following a delayed appendectomy.

Career Record
In 1927 Tokyo and Osaka sumo merged and four tournaments a year in Tokyo and other locations began to be held.

References

See also

Glossary of sumo terms
List of past sumo wrestlers
List of sumo tournament top division champions
List of yokozuna

1903 births
1938 deaths
Japanese sumo wrestlers
Yokozuna
Sumo people from Kōchi Prefecture
Sumo wrestlers who died while active